The Central Fire Station is a historic fire station on 40 Pleasant Street in Brockton, Massachusetts.  Built in 1884–85, the three story brick mansard-roofed Second Empire building included a number of "firsts".  It was the first brick fire house in the city, and it was the nation's first fire house to be electrified, receiving its power via an underground cable from a nearby power plant that had been built under the supervision of Thomas Alva Edison.

The building was listed on the National Register of Historic Places in 1977.

See also
National Register of Historic Places listings in Plymouth County, Massachusetts

References

Fire stations completed in 1885
Fire stations on the National Register of Historic Places in Massachusetts
Buildings and structures in Brockton, Massachusetts
National Register of Historic Places in Plymouth County, Massachusetts